The A6 highway (locally referred to as the Limassol – Paphos highway,  marked the ending of an ambitious government project to link all the main cities on the island with modern four-lane, high-speed highways. It is 66 km long and is free of any at-grade intersections. It links Limassol, the largest port (and second largest city) on the island, and Paphos, the top tourist destination on the island. It was completed in 2006 when the Polemidia and Troodos junction upgrade was completed. Some minor improvements have been made since completion, and many more are being planned. A new highway, A7, is planned to link Paphos and Polis, a small municipality 33 km north. The A7 highway will be connected to the A6 hardly 5 km outside Paphos entrance.

See also 
 A1 motorway (Cyprus)
 A2 motorway (Cyprus)
 A4 motorway (Cyprus)
 A5 motorway (Cyprus)
 A7 motorway (Cyprus)
 A9 motorway (Cyprus)
 A22 motorway (Cyprus)

References 

Motorways and roads in Cyprus
Limited-access roads